DMG MORI AKTIENGESELLSCHAFT  (name written in capital letters; until September 2013: Gildemeister AG, until June 2015: DMG MORI SEIKI AKTIENGESELLSCHAFT) is one of Germany's largest manufacturers of cutting machine tools and a manufacturer of CNC-controlled Lathes and Milling machines. Products include machines, industrial services and software and energy solutions. The SDAX technology group has 21 production sites worldwide and 161 international sales and service sites. The company is based in Bielefeld.

History 

On 1 October 1870, locksmith Friedrich Gildemeister founded the ‘Werkzeugmaschinenfabrik (Machine Tool Plant) Gildemeister & Comp’ back in the ‘pioneer days’ in Germany. In the following decades, the plant near the Cologne-Minden train station in Bielefeld was expanded to include several production facilities.

For over 100 years – until 1976 - the company was based across the street from the main railroad station, where the hotel Bielefelder Hof and the municipal exhibition hall are now situated. Gildemeisterstraße 60 in Bielefeld has since become the group’s headquarters. Today, 7,236 employees and 261 trainees work for the group worldwide.

In 1890, the company had around 100 employees, among them a wages clerk and three technicians to assemble the machines.

In 1899, the former partnership was changed to a public limited company with capital assets of 1 million Goldmarks. In 1920 five engineers founded Maho AG as Mayr, Hoermann & Cie GmbH. Gildemeister went public in 1950 and at the end of 1969, the company became a public company with a broad spectrum of shareholders.

Merger of Deckel & Maho. Later Gildemeister 

In 1993 Friederich Deckel AG and Maho AG merged. In 1994 Gildemeister AG acquired Deckel Maho AG and was renamed Deckel Maho Gildemeister AG.

In 2002, Gildemeister received approval from the German Stock Exchange for admission to the ‘Prime Standard’. Following restructuring of the German Stock Index in March 2003, the Gildemeister share was listed on the SDAX. At the end of December 2007, Gildemeister AG was included in the MDAX stock index.

In 2008, the Public Prosecutor’s Office initiated proceedings against the Gildemeister AG CEO, Rüdiger Kapitza. The charges brought against him included embezzlement, fraud, corruption and tax evasion. In late summer, the Public Prosecutor’s Office and the Financial Market Authority, BaFin, stopped their unsuccessful investigations into insider trading. However, proceedings continued in other areas. Investigations in Austria were also finally stopped in March 2013 and Kapitza was cleared of suspicion of embezzlement and fraud.

Cooperation with Mori Seiki 
In March 2009, the company signed a cooperation agreement with the Japanese company Mori Seiki. This agreement allowed the company to further consolidate its sales and service network in global key markets. The cooperation in markets in Taiwan, Thailand, Indonesia and Turkey  was followed by the USA and India.
Since September 2011, the two companies have continued to further expand their joint market presence in Europe.

In order to strengthen their successful global cooperation, Gildemeister and Mori Seiki signed a cooperation agreement and decided to align their company names. On 1 October 2013, Gildemeister Aktiengesellschaft became DMG MORI Seiki Aktiengesellschaft. Mori Seiki changed its name to DMG MORI Seiki Company Limited. On the global market, both companies used the DMG MORI brand.

On 21 January 2015, the DMG MORI Seiki Aktiengesellschaft signed another cooperation agreement with DMG MORI Seiki Co., Ltd. This agreement specified objectives for strategic growth and sought to consolidate the successful cooperation between the companies. On 8 June 2015, DMG MORI Seiki Aktiengesellschaft became DMG MORI Aktiengesellschaft and DMG MORI Seiki Company Limited changed its name to DMG MORI Company Limited as a further confirmation of the merger.

Both companies are main shareholders: DMG MORI AG (Gildemeister), holds 9.6 per cent of DMG MORI CO. LTD. and DMG MORI CO. LTD. holds 52.54 per cent (status: 7 May 2015) of DMG MORI AG.

References

External links

 

Companies based in North Rhine-Westphalia
Engineering companies of Germany
German brands
Machine tool builders